Olubukola Mary Akinpelu (born 20 September), also known as Mylifeassugar, is a Nigerian-born United States Navy Sailor, registered nurse, nurse coach content creator.

Life and career
Olubukola relocated to the United States from Nigeria, after which she joined the navy, She is a petty officer in the navy. She worked her way through nursing school, graduating with honors and becoming a registered nurse and a nurse coach helping many nursing students to succeed with her online contents. She coached nurse Jamiu-Okuniyi Kabirah, McLeod Ebony and many others.  Mylifeassugar was describes as one of the top five Nigerian female content creators in 2022  in an article published in the Nigerian newspaper The Nation.Mylifeassugar covers Yessiey Magazine fashion issue Vol 1, issue 1 December 2022.

References

Living people
Navy, Army and Air Force Institutes
American women nurses
United States Navy non-commissioned officers
American people of Nigerian descent
Year of birth missing (living people)